The kicksled or spark is a small sled consisting of a chair mounted on a pair of flexible metal runners that extend backward to about twice the chair's length. The sled is propelled by kicking (sparka or sparke in the Scandinavian languages) the ground by foot. There is a handlebar attached to the top of the chair back. "Kicksled" is a direct translation of the Finnish word potkukelkka. Estonian calls it either "pushsled" (tõukekelk) or "Finnish sled" (Soome kelk). Some other possible translations are "kicker" and "chair-sled".

Design 

 
The kicksled is driven forward by the driver standing on one  runner, kicking backwards on the ground with the other foot, hence the name. The flexibility of the runners allows the driver to steer the kicksled by twisting the handlebars. One can have a passenger or luggage on the chair seat. The kicksled can also be used as a dog sled.

A kicksled is designed to be used on hard, slippery surfaces like ice or hardpacked snow. To kicksled in deeper, more powdery snow, extra-wide plastic snow runners are attached to the standard, thin runners of the sled. On very smooth, bare ice, the use of traction devices like spiked shoes or crampons improves kicking force.

The kicksled is in common use in Sweden, Norway and Finland,  especially where roads are not sanded or salted. Stereotypically it is used by old women in the countryside.

It is also an excellent means of travelling over frozen lakes to go ice fishing or just to explore the lake. Kicksledding on lake ice shares many of the same features as tour skating.

Some models also include a wheel kit allowing to transform the sled to a kind of walking aid for summer use. This type is especially popular amongst the elderly.

History

The first definite record of a kicksled was in a newspaper in northern Sweden around 1870. The kicksleds of that era had stiff wooden runners and were heavy. In 1909 the design of the modern kicksled with flexible metal runners was introduced by the Swedish factory Orsasparken, 
which quickly became standard in Sweden, Finland and Norway.

Racing 

In the years 1890 to 1910 kicksled racing was a popular sport, especially in Sweden. Kicksled racing was a major event in the
Nordic Games, which were the ancestor of the Winter Olympics.

Around 1990 kicksled racing was revived as a serious sport in Finland. Often the kicksled races are held in conjunction with marathon speed skating races on natural ice; the kicksleds use the same ice track as the skaters.

A light-weight racing kicksled model is mass-produced by the Finnish kicksled company ESLA. Another racing and sport purposed aluminium-alloy based ultralight kicksled - the Kickspark is produced by Kickbike Worldwide in Finland.

In Canada, the kick sled has been modified for dog sports. A bridle is attached to the kick sled, and a gangline to that, with one to three dogs pulling. This small sled is useful for the urban dog owner, as it is lighter and easier to transport than a full scale dog sled. Kick sled races are now being held, with teams racing at times comparable to skijorers.

Norways's Geilo Ski Resort boasts an annual Kicksled World Championship every January.

Further reading
 Sparkstöttingar by Göran Rosander; Stockholm; Nordiska Museet; 1995;

References

External links

GoSlide - North American Distributor of Kicksleds
Vansbro sparkfabrik - Swedish manufacturer of kicksleds
Brave The Snow - Minneapolis St. Paul Twin Cities retailer of ESLA kicksleds
Ely Bike and Kicksled - Minnesota Kicksled Retailer and kicksledding video
Kicksled Revolution - Yukon importer and retailer of ESLA kicksleds, leader of spring lake ice "kickspeditions".
Article on the Kicksled
Kicksled videos
Article on the Kicksled,Stowe Today
Mountain Boy Sleds - US Maker of Kicksleds
Finnish producer of sporting kicksleds
Kicksled Handbook from Finland (from Wayback archive 2019-07-24)
Kicksled World Championships
Spark or Kicksled (23 kB)
Estonian distributor of nordic kicksleds
 Historical References in Swedish or Norwegian:
Kicksled racing in 1890 Sweden
Museum in Sweden with earliest known article about kicksled
The kicksled page of Nansen Produkter AS

Sledding
Snow sports
Sliding vehicles
Human-powered vehicles
Swedish inventions